Wongosport is a Gabonese football club based in Lastoursville.

Current Squad 2006/07

External links
Team Squad

Football clubs in Gabon